Natore Sadar is an upazila of Natore District in the Division of Rajshahi, Bangladesh.

Geography
It has 67,852 households and a total area of 401.29 km2. The upazila is bounded by Atrai and Baghmara upazilas on the north, Bagatipara and Baraigram upazilas on the south, Singra and Gurudaspur upazila on the east, Puthia and Baghmara upazilas on the west.

Demographics
As of the 1991 Bangladesh census, Natore Sadar has a population of 369,136. Males constitute 51.65% of the population, and females 48.35%. This Upazila's eighteen up population is 191401. Natore Sadar has an average literacy rate of 31.2% (7+ years), and the national average of 32.4% literate.

Administration
Natore Thana was formed in 1793 and it was turned into an upazila in 1984. Natore Municipality was formed in 1869.

Natore Sadar Upazila is divided into Naldanga Municipality, Natore Municipality and following 12 union parishads: Bara Horispur, Bipro Belghoria, Brahmapur, Chhatni, Dighapatia, Halsa, Kaphuria, Khajura, Lukshmipur Kholabaria, Madhnagar, Piprul, and Tebaria. The union parishads are subdivided into 263 mauzas and 297 villages.

Naldanga Municipality and Natore Municipality are each subdivided into 9 wards.

Member of Parliament (MP): Md. Shafiqul Islam Shimul.

Education

According to Banglapedia, Natore Government Boys' High School, founded in 1944, is a notable secondary school.

Places to visit
There are a number of interesting sites to visit in Natore Sadar upazila. Some of them are: 
 Natore Rajbari 
 Uttara Gonobhaban
 Chalan beel

See also
 Upazilas of Bangladesh
 Districts of Bangladesh
 Divisions of Bangladesh
 Natore Rajbari

References

Upazilas of Natore District